Louise Donington (born 1984) is a British slalom canoeist who competed at the international level from 2001 to 2013.

She won a gold medal in the K1 team event at the 2009 ICF Canoe Slalom World Championships in La Seu d'Urgell. She also won a gold and a bronze in the same event at the European Championships.

References

12 September 2009 results of the women's K1 team finals at the 2009 ICF Canoe Slalom World Championships. - accessed 12 September 2009.

British female canoeists
Living people
1984 births
Place of birth missing (living people)
Medalists at the ICF Canoe Slalom World Championships